Palacus or Palakus was the king of Crimean Scythia who succeeded his father, Skilurus. Resuming the latter's war against Mithridates the Great, he attempted to besiege Chersonesos but was defeated by Pontic forces under Diophantus. Enlisting the assistance of the Rhoxolani under Tasius, Palacus launched an invasion of the Crimea. The invaders were defeated by Diophantus and accepted Mithridates as their overlord. Palacus was the last Scythian king whose name is attested in classical sources.

References
Content of this page in part derives from the Great Soviet Encyclopedia article on the same subject.

Scythian rulers
Ancient Crimea
2nd-century BC rulers